1900
 Walter Reed, a United States Army major, was appointed president of a board "to study infectious diseases in Cuba paying particular attention to yellow fever." He concurred with Carlos Finlay in identifying mosquitoes as the agent.
 Ignacio Bolívar y Urrutia publishes Catálogo sinóptico de los ortópteros de la fauna ibérica.
 Kálmán Kertész, Mario Bezzi, Paul Stein (entomologist) and Theodor Becker published the first part of a Palaearctic Catalogue of Diptera Katalog der Paläarktischen dipteren in Budapest.
1901
 William Francis de Vismes Kane A catalogue of the Lepidoptera of Ireland-the third (and first comprehensive) catalogue of the Irish macrolepidoptera.
 Augustus Daniel Imms General textbook of Entomology published. 10th revised edition (1977) still one of the most widely used of all insect texts.
 Thomas Hunt Morgan is the first to conduct genetic research with the fruit fly Drosophila melanogaster. In the Fly Room at Columbia University.

1902
 Ronald Ross gained Nobel Prize for Medicine for his discovery that malaria is carried by mosquitoes. The awarding committee made special mention of the work of Giovanni Battista Grassi on the life history of the Plasmodium parasite.
 Charles W. Woodworth A List of the Insects of California published.
 Philogene Auguste Galilee Wytsman started Genera Insectorum, a multi-authored series that consisted of 219 issues, the last occurring in 1970.
 Otto SchmiedeknechtOpuscula Ichneumonologica. Blankenburg.
 William Morton Wheeler appointed curator of invertebrate zoology in the American Museum of Natural History, New York
August Arthur Petry publishes  Ueber die deutschen an Artemisia lebenden Arten der Gattung Bucculatrix Z. nebst Beschreibung einer neuen Art in Deutsche entomologische Zeitschrift Iris 
Peter Esben-Petersen publishes Bidrag til en Fortegnelse over Arktisk Norges Neuropterfauna

1905
 Adolfo Lutz Beitraege zur Kenntniss der brasilianischen Tabaniden. Rev. Soc. Sci. São Paulo 1: 19–32, published
 Raphaël Blanchard Les moustiques. Histoire naturelle et médicale Paris, F.R. de Rudeval, published.
Gabriel Höfner Die Schmetterlinge Kärntens (1905-1915)

1906
 Adalbert Seitz, Gross-Schmetterlinge der Erde commenced. This vast work on Lepidoptera was published in German, English and French. It contained colour plates of all important species.

1907
 William Lundbeck Diptera Danica. Genera and species of flies Hitherto found in Denmark commenced.
 Hamilton Herbert Druce On Neotropical Lycaenidae, with Descriptions of New Species. Proceedings of the Zoological Society of London.
 Henry Christopher McCook Nature's Craftsmen: Popular Studies of Ants and Other Insects.
 Lajos Abafi Magyarország lepkéi (butterflies of Hungary) 1907

1908
 Edmund Reitter Fauna Germanica - Die Käfer des Deutschen Reiches commenced. This five volume masterwork remains in use today, almost 100 years from its inception.
Leonello Picco Contributo allo studio della fauna entomologica Italiano. Elenco sistematico degli Emitteri finora raccolti nella Provincia di Roma.
 Arnold Spuler and Ernst Hofmann Die Schmetterlinge Europas (The Lepidoptera of Europe) was for decades a standard in the study of lepidoptera.

1909
 George Henry Verrall Stratiomyidae and succeeding families of the Diptera Brachycera of Great Britain - British flies published.
 Carlos Chagas observed the peculiar infestation of rural houses in Brazil with Triatoma, a "kissing" bug, later demonstrating that it was the vector of Trypanosoma cruzi, and he was able to prove experimentally that it could be transmitted to marmoset monkeys that were bitten by the infected bug. His description of the new disease was to become a classic in medicine and brought him domestic and international distinction.
 Charles Nicolle reasoned that it was most likely lice that were the vector for epidemic typhus. He tested his theory by infecting a chimpanzee with typhus, retrieving the lice from it, and placing it on a healthy chimpanzee. Within 10 days the second chimpanzee had typhus as well.
 Antonio Berlese Volume I of Gli insetti loro organizzazione, sviluppo, abitudini e rapporti con l'uomo (Volume 2 1925).
 Arnold Pagenstecher Die geographische Verbreitung der Schmetterlinge published in Jena.
 Foundation of Journal of Entomology by Charles Fuller Baker, one of the first revues of economic entomology.
 Murinus Cornelius Piepers, Pieter Cornelius Tobias Snellen and Hans Fruhstorfer. The Rhopalocera of Java commenced. Completed 1918.

1910
 Gilbert John Arrow published the first volume of The Fauna of British India, Including Ceylon and Burma. Lamellicornia 1. Cetoniinae and Dynastinae. Arrow wrote five volumes of this classic work.
 Hans Ferdinand Emil Julius Stichel Lepidoptera Rhopalocera. Fam. Riodinidae. published in J. Wytsman Genera Insectorum 112A completed 1911).
 Hans Fruhstorfer published Family Pieridae in Adalbert Seitz's Macrolepidoptera of the World

1912
 Per Olof Christopher Aurivillius wrote Part 39 of Catalogus Coleopterorum Cerambycidae: Cerambycinae (1912). Aurivillius worked on world insects.

1913

 Charles Paul Alexander A synopsis of part of the Neotropical Crane-flies of the subfamily Limnobinae (Tipulidae).
 Erwin Lindner joined the State Museum of Natural History Stuttgart.
 Otto Kröber Therevidae.Genera.Ins published.
 Karl Eckstein Die Schmetterlinge Deutschlands mit besonderer Berücksichtigung der Biologie commenced (finished 1933).
 G.D. Hale Carpenter joined the London School of Hygiene and Tropical Medicine, and took the Doctor of Medicine examination in 1913 with a dissertation on the tsetse fly (Glossina palpalis) and sleeping sickness.

1914
 Friedrich Georg Hendel Die Arten der Platystominen. Abh. Zool.-Bot. Ges. Wien 8 (1): 1–409, 4 pls. published
 Filippo Silvestri Contribuzione alla conoscenza dei Termitidi e Termitofili dell'Africa occidentale. Bollettino del Laboratorio di Zoologia General e Agraria, Portici.

1915
 Nathan Banks A Treatise on the Acarina, Or Mites the first comprehensive English handbook on mites.
 Reginald Punnett publishes Mimicry in Butterflies.

1916
 The Japanese beetle, Popillia japonica, was first discovered in the United States in Riverton, New Jersey during mid-August 1916.

1920
 Alfred Kinsey became Professor of Entomology at Indiana University Bloomington.
 Ernst Jünger publishes In Stahlgewittern, The Storm of Steel.
 Enrico Adelelmo Brunetti The Fauna of British India, Including Ceylon and Burma. Diptera 1. Brachycera published.
 Charles Thomas Brues Insects and Human Welfare published.
 G.D. Hale Carpenter published: A Naturalist on Lake Victoria, with an Account of Sleeping Sickness and the Tse-tse Fly; 1920. T.F. Unwin Ltd, London; Biodiversity Archive

1921
 Günther Enderlein Über die phyletisch älteren Stratiomyiidensubfamilien (Xylophaginae, Chiromyzinae, Solvinae, Beridinae und Coenomyiinae). Mitt. Zool. Mus. Berl. 10: 150-214 published.

1923
Auguste-Henri Forel publishes a myrmecological 5-volume magnum opus, Le Monde Social des Forimis

1924

 Frederick William Frohawk's Natural History of British Butterflies published.

1925
 Frank M. Carpenter begins work on the Elmo Permian fossil fauna.
 Josef Fahringer Opuscula braconolocica (4 parts, finished 1937) begun.

1927
 Ronald A. Senior-White and Robert Knowles (entomologist) Malaria: Its Investigation and Control, with Special Reference to Indian Conditions. Calcutta: Thacker, Spink and Co published.
 José María Hugo de la Fuente Morales Tablas analíticas para la clasificación de los coleópteros de la Península Ibérica. Barcelona Imprenta Altés, published.
 Zeno Payne Metcalf commenced (as overall editor and author of the Homoptera sections) General Catalogue of the Hemiptera. Completed 1971.

1928
 Jan Noskiewicz with G. Poluszynski Embryologische Untersuchungen an Strepsipteren. I. Teil: Embryogenesis der Gattung Stylops Kirby. Akad. Umiejetnosci..
 Leopold III of Belgium a keen amateur entomologist collects in the Dutch East Indies(1929-1929)
 Guido Grandi founded the Institute of Entomology at the University of Bologna (l'Istituto di Entomologia dell'Università di Bologna).
 World's oldest known insect, Rhyniognatha hirsti named by Robert John Tillyard.
 Alexander Kirilow Drenowski The Lepidoptera fauna on the high mountains of Bulgaria Sbornik bulg. Akad. Nauk. 23: 1–120, 1 map, published.

1930
 Camillo Acqua Il bombice del Gelso:Nello stato normale e patologico nella tecnica dell'allevamento e della riproduzione. (Industria della preparazione del seme Bachi)-Enc. tela. Casa Ed. di Giuseppe Cesari, published. This was an important contribution to the literature on sericulture.

1931
 Georg Hermann Alexander Ochs publishes Über die Gyriniden-Ausbeute der Deutschen Limnologischen Sunda-Expedition mit einer Übersicht über die Gyriniden-Fauna Javas und Larvenbeschreibungen.
 Shonen Matsumura 6,000 illustrated Insects of Japan-Empire.

1932

 A Practical Handbook of British Beetles by Norman H. Joy published by Witherby.
 Alfred Balachowsky Étude biologique des coccides du bassin occidental de la Méditerranée published in Paris by Lechevalier and Fils.

1934
 René Malaise invents the Malaise trap.
 Vincent Brian Wigglesworth, the "Father" of Insect Physiology, writes the first book on insect physiology, The Principles of Insect Physiology.
 Antoni Władysław Jakubski Czerwiec polski "Polish cochineal". Monograph on the Polish cochineal.

1935
 Gerhard Schrader discovers the powerful insecticides called organophosphates
 Walter Rothschild gives his insect collection, one of the world's largest collections of Lepidoptera, to the Natural History Museum.

1936
 The Natural History Museum, London acquires the James John Joicey collection of Lepidoptera.

1938
 Lucien Chopard La biologie des orthoptères (Paul Lechevalier, Paris).
 Ângelo Moreira da Costa Lima commenced Insetos do Brasil, v. 1-11. Completed 1960.

1940
 Vladimir Nabokov begins organizing the butterfly collection of the Museum of Comparative Zoology at Harvard University.
 Ruggero Verity commenced Farfalle, in English Butterflies, of Italia (five volumes, 1940–1953).
 René Jeannel Faune cavernicole de la France, in English The Fauna of the Caves of France, published.

1941
 Zoltán Szilády A magyar birodalom legyeinek szinopszisa. VI. Talpaslegyek, Clythidae (Platypezidae); VIII. Lauxaniidae [Synopsis of the flies of the Hungarian empire].
 Adolf Horion Faunistik der Mitteleuropäischen Käfer commenced. Completed 1974.

1942
 Woodhouse, L. G. O. & George Morrison Reid Henry. The Butterfly Fauna of Ceylon. Government Record Office, Colombo

1943
André Badonnel Faune de France. Psocoptères. Paris. Paul Lechevalier 1943.
Leopold Fulmek Wirtsindex der Aleyrodiden- und Cocciden- Parasiten Entomologische Beihefte 10: 1–100.

1944
Enrica Calabresi commits suicide in Florence.

1945
 Edmund Brisco Ford Butterflies published, seminal introduction to the study of butterflies and their genetics.
 Cynthia Longfield The Odonata of South Angola. Arquivos do Museu Bocage, 16, Lisboa.

1946
 Institut National de la Recherche Agronomique founded.

1947
 Carlo Alonza became director of the Muséum de Gênes.

1949
 Pierre-Paul Grassé ed. Traité de Zoologie Tome IX. Insectes. Paris, 1949. 1118 p.
1950
 Maynard Jack Ramsay becomes Port Entomologist on Staten Island.
 Mahadeva Subramania Mani founded the School of Entomology at Agra, India.

1951
 Work on sterile insect technique begun by American entomologists Raymond Bushland and Edward Knipling. For their achievement, they jointly received the 1992 World Food Prize.
 Sakae Tamura Konchū no seitai: Raika shashinshū (昆虫の生態：ライカ写眞集) or Closeups on Insects. Tokyo: Seibundo-Shinkosha
 Torkel Weis-Fogh pioneered studies of insect flight with August Krogh.

1952
 Bernard Kettlewell begins research into the influence of industrial melanism on natural selection in moths.
 Crodowaldo Pavan introduced into biology the cytogenetical study of Rhynchosciara americana.

1953
 Willi Hennig publishes Grundzüge einer Theorie der phylogenetischen Systematikin Berlin. This was followed by Kritische Bemerkungen zum phylogenetischen System der Insekten in 1953 and Phylogenetic Systematics in 1966. In these works, Hennig founded cladistics.
 Sydney Skaife African Insect Life published.
Catalogue illustré des lucanides du globe in Encyclopédie Entomologique (series A 27: 1-223) by Robert Didier and Eugene Seguy published.

1954
 Grigorij Jakovlevitsch Bey-Bienko Insecta: Orthoptera: Tettigoniidae: Phaneropterinae. Fauna SSSR.

1955
 World programme for malaria eradication begins. Finally abandoned 1969.
 Roy Albert Crowson's The natural classification of the families of Coleoptera is published. This is a classic monograph.
 Alexey Diakonoff Microlepidoptera of New Guinea. Results of the third Archbold Expedition (American- Netherlands Indian Expedition 1938-1939). Part V. Verhandelingen der Koninklijke Nederlandse published 15 years after the expedition.

1957

 Clodoveo Carrión Mora dies in Ecuador. Mora was a leading figure entomology of 20th-century entomology in South America.

1960
 Czesław Bieżanko publishes Álbum iconográfico dos Lepidópteros coletados por Biezanko. Papilionidae.
 Marta Grandi Ephemeroidea. Fauna d'Italia

1961

 Genetic code is cracked. DNA was discovered by Friedrich Miescher in 1868, recognized as the bearer of genetic information in 1943 and revealed as a double helix by Rosalind Franklin in 1952. This leads to radical revision of the higher taxonomy of the Insecta.
1964
 Morris Rockstein's edited series — 3 vols. — The Physiology of Insecta
Takashi Shirozu Butterflies of Japan Illustrated in Colour published in Tokyo by Hokuryu-kan.

1965
 Nikolai Sergeevich Borchsenius Essay on the classification of the armoured scale insects (Homoptera, Coccoidea, Diaspididae). (In Russian.) Entomologicheskoe Obozrenye 44: 208–214.

1966
 First international Red Lists of endangered species were published.

1967
 Richard E. Blackwelder Taxonomy: a Text and Reference Book John. Wiley and Sons, New York, published.

1968
 David Allan Young Taxonomic Study of the Cicadellinae (Homoptera: Cicadellidae) commenced. Finished 1986.

1969
 Reg Chapman's textbook appears — The Insects-Structure and Function. American Elsevier, N.Y.
 International Centre of Insect Physiology and Ecology established.

1971
 Maximilian Fischer Index of Entomophagous Insects. Le Francois, Paris.

1973
 Karl von Frisch awarded Nobel Prize for pioneering work on insect behaviour.
 Warwick Estevam Kerr Evolution of the population structure in bees. Genetics 79: 73–84.

1976
 Anastase Alfieri The Coleoptera of Egypt published.

1981
 Robert Michael Pyle published The National Audubon Society Field Guide to North American Butterflies. Knopf.

1981
 CESA Centre for Entomological Studies Ankara An international private research centre and museum on Entomology established by Ahmet Omer Kocak in Ankara, Turkey.

1984
 Árpád Soós and Lazlo Papp begin editing Catalogue of Palaearctic Diptera.1984 - 1992.
 Justin O. Schmidt publishes first paper on the Schmidt Sting Pain Index.

1985
 Murray S. Blum Fundamentals of Insect Physiology. New York: Wiley, 1985.
 Gerald A. Kerkut and L. I. Gilbert Comprehensive Insect Physiology, Biochemistry & Pharmacology.

1987
 Stephen Taber III Breeding Super Bee. Ohio: AI Root Co, 1987.

1989
 Forensic entomologist Mark Benecke joins the punk rock band "Die Blonden Burschen", The Blonde Boys. Many past entomologists were also musical.

1990

 Bert Hölldobler and E. O. Wilson publish The Ants. The following year, it will be the only entomology textbook to win the Pulitzer Prize for non-fiction. 
 Low cost Scanning electron microscope came into general use

1991
 Naumann, I. D., P. B. Carne, J. F. Lawrence, E. S. Nielsen, J. P. Spradberry, R. W. Taylor, M. J. Whitten and M. J. Littlejohn, eds. The Insects of Australia: A Textbook for Students and Research Workers. Volume I and II. Second Edition. Carlton, Victoria, Melbourne University Press.

1993
 Edward Grumbine, Ghost Bears: Exploring the Biodiversity Crisis reflects growing concerns. Insects are major indicators of environmental destruction and impending mass extinction.

1994
 Hoy, M. Insect molecular genetics. An introduction to principles and applications.
 Vladimir Nikolayevich Beklemishev Методология систематики (Methodology of systematics).KMK Scientific Press Ltd.

1995
 Yuri Petrovich Korshunov and Pavel Yunievich Gorbunov Butterflies of the Urals, Siberia and Far East published.

1996
 Microcosmos released in France.

1997
 Perry Adkisson receives World Food Prize for his work on Integrated Pest Management.

1998
 Paul R. Ehrlich publishes Betrayal of Science and Reason: How Anti-Environment Rhetoric Threatens Our Future (1998, co-authored with his wife)
 Phylocode proposed following a meeting at Harvard University.

1999
 Ebbe Schmidt Nielsen instrumental in setting up the Global Biodiversity Information Facility

2000
 Loïc Matile Diptères d'Europe Occidentale Tomes 1 and 2 Atlas d'Entomologie.Editions N. Boubée.Paris.

2001
 First volume of American Beetles published. Ross H. Arnett, Jr. and Michael C. Thomas.

2002
 Alex Rasnitsyn with D.L.J. Quicke History of Insects. Kluwer Academic Publishers.

2004
 Gilbert, L.I. (ed.). 2004. Comprehensive molecular insect science, 7 vols. Elsevier Pergamon, published in St. Louis
 A paper in Science found that Culex pipiens mosquitoes existed in two populations in Europe, one which bites birds and one which bites humans. In North America 40% of Culex pipiens were found to be hybrids of the two types which bite both birds and humans, providing a vector for West Nile virus. This is thought to provide an explanation of why the West Nile disease has spread more quickly in North America than Europe.

2005
 The Insect Biocontrol Laboratory at the Henry A. Wallace Beltsville Agricultural Research Center in the United States develops DNA fingerprinting tools that match hard-to-identify larvae to adults that have been positively identified.
 Michael S. Engel and David Grimaldi Evolution of the Insects published.

See also
 List of entomologists
 Timeline of entomology — for a list of other available time periods

Entomology
Entomology post 1900